Black River State Forest is a state forest located in the western half of Jackson County, Wisconsin near Black River Falls, Wisconsin, U.S.A.. It is administered by the Wisconsin Department of Natural Resources. The park has campsites, trails, and allows for hunting, ATV, and canoeing.
It is at the edge of the Driftless Area of Wisconsin, and is more rugged than what is found in the eastern half of the county.

Environmental management 
Each year, around 1000 acres (4.05 km2) of forest in the park are used for logging. Logs are harvested for regeneration of the forest via selective cutting.

In 2015 and 2016, elk were reintroduced into the park.

References

External links
Wisconsin Department of Natural Resources - Black River State Forest

Driftless Area
Protected areas of Jackson County, Wisconsin
Wisconsin state forests
Protected areas established in 1957
1957 establishments in Wisconsin